This is the list of Schedule V drugs as defined by the United States Controlled Substances Act.
The following findings are required for drugs to be placed in this schedule:
 The drug or other substance has a low potential for abuse relative to the drugs or other substances in schedule IV.
 The drug or other substance has a currently accepted medical use in treatment in the United States.
 Abuse of the drug or other substance may lead to limited physical dependence or psychological dependence relative to the drugs or other substances in schedule IV.

The complete list of Schedule V drugs follows. The Administrative Controlled Substances Code Number for each drug is included.

Opiates and opioids

Stimulants

Cannabinoids

Others

References

Controlled Substances Act
Drug-related lists